Below is the list of sport venues in Mersin, Turkey. Some of these were constructed for the 2013 Mediterranean Games. (The list excludes those venues in Mersin Province, out of Mersin city)

Most of the above venues were used in 2013 Mediterranean Games. Tevfik Sırrı Gür Stadium is the home of Mersin İdmanyurdu football team and Edip Buran Sports hall is the home of Mersin Büyükşehir women's and Mersin Büyükşehir men's basketball teams.

Gallery